The COMSATS University Islamabad (CUI), formerly known as COMSATS Institute of Information Technology (CIIT), is a public university in Pakistan. It is a multi-campus university with its principal seat located in Islamabad. Comsats was envisioned as Pakistan's first exclusive Institute of Information Technology. In the latest QS University Rankings, CUI ranked 7th in Pakistan and 801-1000 in the world. Nationally it is ranked top-most in Computer Sciences and IT category. COMSATS University Islamabad (CUI) is under the administration of the Commission on Science and Technology for Sustainable Development in the South.

Overview
The university was established by the Commission on Science and Technology for Sustainable Development in the South (COMSATS) in 1998, while its first charter was granted by the Government of Pakistan in August 2000. Palestine joined the COMSATS as its 23rd member state in October 2015. S. M. Junaid Zaidi is the Founder Rector of the university and continued to serve the university till March 2017. The position of Rector remained vacant for the period of almost three years and Muhammad Tabassum Afzal assumed charge as Rector in July 2020 and was tasked with leading the university after its transition from an Institute of Information Technology to a full-fledged university having a new governance structure. Comsats was envisioned as Pakistan's first exclusive Institute of Information Technology. Previously, its name was COMSATS Institute of Information Technology (CIIT), which was transformed into a full-fledged university called the COMSATS University Islamabad (CUI) by an Act of Parliament in April 2018.

This university was ranked among the top 250 Asian Universities by QS University Rankings in 2014 and nationally it is ranked top-most in Computer Sciences and IT category and 1st overall in the country according to NatureIndex. CIIT is ranked amongst the top 10 universities of Pakistan as per HEC recent rankings. It is also a member of the Association of Commonwealth Universities. Its main campus, located in Islamabad, has over 8,500 students and 30,000 more students in its 6 satellite campuses. Its student body also includes international students from over 9 countries. It has 20 departments which combined offer 100 degree programs and has since inception produced over 315 PhDs. It has also established the country's first ever Student Startup Business Center (SSBC) to support and promote entrepreneurship and innovation in its academic environment. In partnership with Brookes Pharma (Private) Limited (Métier pharma), the Career Development Center at Comsats University Islamabad Campus hosted an awareness session on "Women's Health and Hygiene." Young female Comsats students attended the session, which was quite informative for them.

International Rankings

In the Times Higher Education World University Rankings 2020, CUI has been placed among 801-1000 world's best universities, and ranked 2nd in Pakistan. Besides, it was also ranked at #301-400 in THE Engineering & Technology, #401-500 in Computer Science, and Life Sciences and #501-600 in Physical Sciences subject rankings 2019. CUI was also ranked 159th in THE Emerging Economies Rankings 2020, 131st in THE Asian University Rankings 2019, and was among 150-200 THE top young universities of the world in 2018.

· Ranked at 301+ in THE University Impact Rankings 2019, and 5th in Pakistan. Inaugural participant. Besides, CUI was ranked in its 07 SDGS out of 11:
SDG 3 Good Health and Wellbeing (ranked 301+)
SDG 8 Decent Work and Economic Growth (ranked 101–200)
SDG 9 Industry, Innovation and Infrastructure (ranked 201–300)
SDG 11 Sustainable Cities and Communities (ranked 201+)
SDG 13 Climate Action (ranked 201+)
SDG 16 Peace, Justice and Strong Institutions (ranked 201+)
SDG 17 Partnerships for goals 301+.

QS Rankings 
CUI was ranked 801-1000 among the world's best universities as per the QS World Universities Rankings 2020. Besides, it was ranked 135th in the QS Asian Universities Rankings 2019. In 2013, it also received the prestigious 3-Stars Rating by QS.

Shanghai Rankings 
CUI was ranked first in Pakistan and amongst 501-600 ranked university in the world by the Academic Ranking of World Universities (ARWU) prestigious Shanghai Rankings 2019.

Campuses
COMSATS university is a multi-campus university. Apart from the main campus in Islamabad, the university also has sub-campuses located in Lahore, Attock, Vehari, Abbottabad, Wah and Sahiwal as well as one virtual campus. COMSATS University has seven campuses, 100-degree programs, 36000 enrolled students, 700 Ph.D. students, 500 Master's students, 1077 Ph.D. instructors, and is ranked second in research and first in IT.

Islamabad
The main campus in Islamabad was established in 1998. During the first year of its establishment, the institute offered only a few certificate courses and a postgraduate diploma in computer studies with a single classroom and limited resources. The Islamabad campus is situated at Chak Shahzad, Islamabad. Currently, more than 8,055 students are enrolled in various degree programs at this campus. The newly-built campus is fully equipped with facilities that meet international standards. It is a marvel of modern architecture surrounded by a lush green environment and peaceful surroundings.

Abbottabad

The Abbottabad campus became functional in July 2001 through the initiative of founder director Haroon-ur-Rasheed and the first academic session started in September 2001. This campus is ideally situated in the vicinity of the Pakistan Military Academy, Kakul. The campus is built on 308 Kanals of land leased from GHQ by the Pakistan Army at Tobe Camp. 
The abandoned army barracks were converted into a living campus within a short period of two months by the university team. The first academic session started with a student strength of 121 and only three undergraduate programs.

Attock
The Attock campus was established in 2004. There are 4 departments, 9 undergraduate, and 6 graduate programs that are being offered. More than 2,650 students are enrolled with a qualified faculty strength of 179 including 55 PhDs. More than 500 research papers are published.

Vehari

Established in 2008, the Vehari campus started with 45 students enrolled in one program and now it has more than 2,385 students, more than 180 faculty members, 14 programs, and three functional academic blocks.

Lahore

The Lahore Campus is located on 01 km, Defence Road, Off Raiwind Road and is a 30-minute drive from the main city. This campus was established in January 2002.

 Campus Established: 2002
 Total Area: 185 Acres
 Total no. of faculty: 512
 Total no. of PhD faculty: 227
 Total Programs Offered: 37
 Enrolled Students: 7148
 Total Graduates till Spring-2019 : 13317

Wah

The opening of COMSATS University in the historical and industrial town of Wah was a joint effort of the university and Pakistan Ordnance Factories (POF) which is located in Wah Cantonment. The university management started campus at Wah in a record period of 70 days. The then-Minister for Science and Technology and Chancellor of the university formally inaugurated the institute on 14 September 2001. Initially, the Wah campus started its operation in the small guest house of POF. In 2003, two purpose-built academic blocks were handed over to the university on a long-term lease period by the POF. The Wah campus extended its academic facilities by purchasing land contiguous to the existing campus in 2012 measuring 96 Kanals. The campus has also acquired 20 Acres of land near Brahma Bahtar Interchange on the M1 motorway to meet its future academic requirements.

Sahiwal
The Sahiwal campus situated at Sahiwal was formally inaugurated in September 2007. It has 7 academic departments and 10 other services departments. It has 3800 students from different departments.

Virtual Campus
The CUI virtual campus was established in July 2008 and started its regular functions in January 2012. The campus was established in offices, laboratories, and studios located in Islamabad having approximately 20,000 sq. ft. of covered area. State-of-the-art servers, dedicated PERN (Pakistan Educational Research Network) bandwidth, as well as the latest audiovisual equipment, was acquired to set up laboratories, studios, and a data center. The virtual campus started its first academic session in Fall 2012 offering four undergraduate level degree programs in computer science and management science subjects. The Virtual Campus was stalled in 2016 due to an absence of a Virtual Education Policy by the Higher Education Commission of Pakistan.

Academics 
The university is offering undergraduate and graduate programs in different disciplines, different programs available at different campuses.

Undergraduate programs 
COMSATS offers undergraduate programs for BS and bachelors degrees.

Bachelor of Science 

 Accounting & Finance
 Bioinformatics
 Biotechnology
 Biosciences
 Business Administration
 Chemical Engineering
 Civil Engineering
 Computer Engineering
 Computer Science
 Development Studies
 Economics
 Electronics
 Electrical Engineering
 Electrical (Electronics) Engineering
 Electrical (Power) Engineering
 Environmental Sciences
 Food Sciences and Nutrition
 Geology
 Geophysics
 Mathematics
 Mechanical Engineering
 Physics
 Psychology
 Software Engineering
 Statistics
 Media and Communication Studies
 English
 Data Sciences
 Artificial Intelligence
 Cyber Security

Bachelor 

 Architecture
 Design
 Interior design 
 Fine Arts

PhD 

 Pharmacy (Pharm-D)

Graduate programs

Department of Computer Science 

 MS in Computer Science
 MS in Information Security
 MS in Software Engineering
 MS in Artificial Intelligence
 PhD in Computer Science

Department of Health Informatics 

 MS in Health Informatics

Department of Electrical and Computer Engineering 

 MS in Computer Engineering
 MS in Electrical Engineering
 PhD in Computer Engineering
 PhD in Electrical Engineering

Department of Chemical Engineering 

 MS in Chemical Engineering
 MS in Energy & Environmental Engineering
 PhD in Chemical Engineering

Department of Civil Engineering 

 MS in Environmental Engineering
 MS in Civil Engineering

Department of Mechanical Engineering 

 MS in Mechanical Engineering

Department of Management Sciences 

 MS in Management Sciences
 MS in Project Management
 MBA
 PhD in Management Sciences

Department of Economics 

 MS in Economics

Department of Development Studies 

 MS in Development Studies
 MS in Conflict, Peace and Development Studies
 MS in Water, Sanitation, Health and Development
 PhD in Development Studies

Department of Humanities 

 MS in International Relations
 MS in English (Linguistic and Literature)

Department of Environmental Sciences 

 MS in Biotechnology
 MS in Environmental Sciences
 PhD in Biotechnology
 PhD in Environmental Sciences

Department of Mathematics 

 MS in Mathematics
 PhD in Mathematics

Department of Chemistry 

 MS in Chemistry
 PhD in Chemistry

Department of Pharmacy 

 MS in Pharmacy
 PhD in Pharmacy

Department of Biosciences 

 MS in Biochemistry and Molecular Biology
 MS in Bioinformatics
 MS in Biosciences
 MS in Microbiology and Immunology
 MS in Molecular Genetics
 MS in Molecular Virology
 PhD in Biochemistry and Molecular Biology
 PhD in Biosciences
 PhD in Microbiology and Immunology
 PhD in Molecular Genetics

Department of Meteorology 

 MS in Meteorology
 MS in Remote Sensing & GIS
 PhD in Meteorology

Department of Physics 

 MS in Physics
 PhD in Physics

Department of Earth Sciences 

 MS in Earth Sciences (Applied Geology/Applied Geophysics

Department of Statistics 

 MS in Statistics
 PhD in Statistics

Notable alumni 
Sadia Bashir - Foundress and CEO of PixelArt Games Academy, the first game training academy in Pakistan. She is the first Pakistani to represent at the Game Developer's Conference.
Aisha Mughal - Pakistani transgender rights expert and researcher. 
Atta ur Rehman Khan - Founder of the National Cyber Crime Forensics Lab Pakistan.

References

External links
 CUI official website

Educational institutions established in 1998
1998 establishments in Pakistan
Public universities and colleges in Pakistan
Universities and colleges in Abbottabad
Universities and colleges in Islamabad
Engineering universities and colleges in Pakistan